Hypocharassus is a genus of flies in the family Dolichopodidae. In some classifications of the subfamily Hydrophorinae, the genus is the only member of the tribe Hypocharassini.

Species
Hypocharassus cavitarsus Kim & Suh, 2022 – Korea
Hypocharassus farinosus Becker, 1922 – Taiwan
Hypocharassus gladiator Mik, 1878 – south-eastern USA
Hypocharassus pruinosus (Wheeler, 1898) – eastern USA
Hypocharassus sinensis Yang, 1998 – southern China

References

Hydrophorinae
Dolichopodidae genera
Diptera of North America
Diptera of Asia
Taxa named by Josef Mik